is a song recorded by Japanese singer Misia, from her eleventh studio album New Morning. It was released as the album's lead single by Ariola Japan on September 4, 2013. The song was used in a promotional campaign and televised commercials for the bridal magazine Zexy, starring thirty owarai comedians and Airi Matsui.

Background and composition
"Shiawase o Forever" is Misia's first physical single release in over eight months, since "Back in Love Again". The title track was written by Misia and composed by Toshiaki Matsumoto, their first collaboration on a single since "Hatenaku Tsuzuku Story" (2002). The song is written in the key of A major with a common time tempo of 74 beats per minute. Misia's vocals span two octaves, from E3 to E5. The B-side "Daisy" was written by Japanese singer-songwriter Kaori Sawada, who toured with Misia as backing vocalist on her Hoshizora no Live VII 15th Celebration concert tour, as well as on the Misia Candle Night Fes. tour, where Misia debuted "Shiawase o Forever".

Music video
The music video to "Shiawase o Forever" was written and directed by Ellie Omiya. It is set at the wedding reception of a couple, played by Noriyuki Higashiyama and Kazue Fukiishi, and features flashbacks that depict their relationship from the budding stage all the way to their wedding day. These flashbacks at interspersed between past and present shots of guests, portrayed by several actors and comedians, including Kazuya Kojima and Asako Ito, showing us their involvement in the shaping of their love story. Omiya jokingly commented that she wanted to create a music video that would entice people to get married so they could resolve Japan's declining birth rate.

Critical reception
CDJournal critics acclaimed Misia for "hitting the nail on the head" with "Shiawase o Forever". They described the song as "tasteful" and predicted it would surely become a new standard at weddings.

Chart performance
"Shiawase o Forever" debuted at number 26 on the weekly Oricon Singles Chart, with 3,000 copies sold. It charted for five weeks and sold a reported total of 5,000 copies during its run.

Track listing

Credits and personnel
Personnel

 Vocals – Misia
 Backing vocals – Hanah Spring, Kaori Sawada, Lyn
 Songwriting – Misia, Toshiaki Matsumoto
 Arrangement, production, harpsichord – Tohru Shigemi
 Drums – Fuyu
 Bass – Jino
 Guitar – Shuhei Yamaguchi
 Tubular bells – Tamao Fujii
 Engineering, mixing – Masahiro Kawaguchi
 Mastering – Herb Powers Jr.

Charts

References

External links

2013 singles
2013 songs
Misia songs
Songs written by Misia
Songs used as jingles
Songs about marriage
Ariola Japan singles